Jonathan Enrique Betancourt Mina (born 14 February 1995, in Ecuador) is an Ecuadorian footballer who plays for Deportivo Garcilaso.

Career

In 2013, Betancourt signed for Porto, one of Portugal's most successful clubs.

In 2014, he signed for Gondomar S.C. in the Portuguese third division.

For 2018, he signed for Barcelona S.C., Ecuador's most successful team.

In 2020, Betancourt was sent on loan to Querétaro in Mexico.

References

External links
 Jonathan Betancourt at Soccerway

Ecuadorian footballers
Living people
Association football forwards
Association football midfielders
1995 births
S.D. Aucas footballers
Gondomar S.C. players
L.D.U. Quito footballers
Barcelona S.C. footballers
C.D. Universidad Católica del Ecuador footballers
Querétaro F.C. footballers
Ecuadorian Serie A players
Ecuadorian expatriate footballers
Expatriate footballers in Mexico